Spidia goniata is a moth in the family Drepanidae. It was described by Watson in 1957. It is found in Uganda.

References

Endemic fauna of Uganda
Moths described in 1957
Drepaninae